Mikhail Viktorovich Panin (born January 15, 1961) is a retired Soviet ice hockey center and Russian ice hockey coach. He was the head coach for Barys Astana during 2006–07 season. During his career he played for Torpedo Ust-Kamenogorsk, CSKA Moscow, SKA Leningrad, Krylya Sovetov Moscow and PEV Weißwasser. He also was a member of the Soviet Union national junior ice hockey team.

International statistics

References

External links

1961 births
Barys Astana head coaches
HC CSKA Moscow players
Kazzinc-Torpedo players
Krylya Sovetov Moscow players
Lausitzer Füchse players
Living people
Russian ice hockey centres
Sportspeople from Oskemen
Soviet ice hockey centres
SKA Saint Petersburg players